Brookhaven is a hamlet and census-designated place in Suffolk County, New York, United States. The population was 3,451 at the 2010 census.

The hamlet of Brookhaven is located within, and directly governed by the Town of Brookhaven.

Geography

Demographics

As of the census of 2000, there were 3,570 people, 1,101 households, and 833 families residing in the CDP. The population density was 590.3 per square mile (227.8/km2). There were 1,167 housing units at an average density of 193.0/sq mi (74.5/km2). The racial makeup of the CDP was 84.99% White, 10.11% Black or African American, 0.25% Native American, 0.64% Asian, 0.03% Pacific Islander, 1.34% from other races, and 2.63% from two or more races. Hispanic or Latino of any race were 6.39% of the population.

There were 1,101 households, out of which 34.3% had children under the age of 18 living with them, 61.0% were married couples living together, 10.5% had a female householder with no husband present, and 24.3% were non-families. 17.3% of all households were made up of individuals, and 4.0% had someone living alone who was 65 years of age or older. The average household size was 2.76 and the average family size was 3.13.

In the CDP, the population was spread out, with 25.2% under the age of 18, 6.4% from 18 to 24, 26.4% from 25 to 44, 26.7% from 45 to 64, and 15.2% who were 65 years of age or older. The median age was 39 years. For every 100 females, there were 88.7 males. For every 100 females age 18 and over, there were 86.3 males.

The median income for a household in the CDP was $70,357, and the median income for a family was $80,863. Males had a median income of $49,886 versus $33,611 for females. The per capita income for the CDP was $27,044. About 5.8% of families and 11.5% of the population were below the poverty threshold, including 14.2% of those under age 18 and 2.3% of those age 65 or over.

References

External links

 The Sister Hamlets of Brookhaven and South Haven - Views and History

Brookhaven, New York
Hamlets in New York (state)
Census-designated places in New York (state)
Census-designated places in Suffolk County, New York
Hamlets in Suffolk County, New York
Populated coastal places in New York (state)